Statistics of the Scottish Football League in season 2008–09.

Scottish First Division

Scottish Second Division

Scottish Third Division

See also
2008–09 in Scottish football

References

 
Scottish Football League seasons